OpenMandriva Lx is a Linux distribution forked from Mandriva Linux.  It is maintained by the OpenMandriva Association.

History

Origin of the distribution
OpenMandriva Lx is a community Linux distribution. Originally an offering of Mandriva Linux, the OpenMandriva product was created in May, 2012, when Mandriva S.A. avoided bankruptcy by abandoning the development of its consumer product to the Mandriva community. The first stable version (OpenMandriva Lx 2013 "Oxygen") was released in late 2013.

OpenMandriva Association
The OpenMandriva Association was established on December 12, 2012 under 1901 French law, to represent the OpenMandriva Community. It manages free software projects including OpenMandriva Lx.

OpenMandriva Lx development environment 
OpenMandriva Lx's development environment is an ABF (Automated Build Farm) which can manage the source codes, compile it to binaries. Also ABF creates the package repository and ISO images.

Versions
In late 2013, the first version of OpenMandriva Lx was released. It was based on Mandriva Linux 2011, which was itself an amalgamation of ROSA Linux and Mandriva SA.

OpenMandriva Lx 2014 "Phosphorus" was released on 1 May 2014. The release had a very positive review from one of the founders of the initial Mandrake Linux distribution, Gaël Duval.

OpenMandriva Lx 2014.2, codenamed "The Scion", a bugfix release for 2014.1, was released on 29 June 2015.

During 2015, OpenMandriva released an alpha version of OpenMandriva Lx 2015. As the operating system was developed all 2015 year, in 2016, the version was released as OpenMandriva Lx 3.0 Beta. This new release came with significant changes to the core system — among other things, it was the first desktop Linux distribution that was built completely with the Clang compiler instead of GCC.

A stable and final release of OpenMandriva Lx 3.0 was released in August 2016, followed by 3.01 in December 2016 and 3.02 in June 2017. This was followed by OpenMandriva Lx 3.03, which was released in November 2017.

After releasing OpenMandriva Lx 3.03, OpenMandriva Lx developers started dropping support of i586 processor architecture in OpenMandriva Lx 4.0.

The development of OpenMandriva Lx 4.0 continued on for two years after Lx 3.03 was released.

The OpenMandriva Lx 4.0 stable release arrived in June 2019. Among many other changes, this release is notable for switching to the DNF package manager for software management, including Mageia's dnfdragora to replace rpmdrake.

OpenMandriva Lx 4.3 was released in February 2022. One of the notable changes in this version is that PipeWire became Mandriva's default sound server replacing PulseAudio.

In January 2023 the OpenMandriva community released their "ROME" edition, a rolling distribution designed for individual users. This version will contain the latest versions of available software packages.

Version history (stable )

Development versions

OpenMandriva Lx 2013.0 

OpenMandriva Lx 2013.0 was released on November 22, 2013 with codename "Oxygen".

This version was the first release of OpenMandriva Lx, and was the fork of Mandriva Linux 2011.0. The version includes KDE 4.11.2. Menu in OpenMandriva Lx 2013.0 was SimpleWelcome, and also this version included media player ROSA Media Player 1.6, Mozilla Firefox 25.0, LibreOffice 4.1.3 and the Linux kernel 3.11.6.

OpenMandriva Lx 4.0 
OpenMandriva Lx 4.0 will support ARM64 (aarch64) and ARM v7 (armv7hnl) architectures. After arriving RISC-V board, OpenMandriva will start porting distribution to open source CPUs.

The first alpha version of OpenMandriva Lx 4.0 was released on September 6, 2018.

The OpenMandriva Lx 4.0 Major Release Alpha 1 was released on December 25, 2018, the Beta was released on February 9, 2019 and the Release Candidate was released on May 12, 2019.

The OpenMandriva Lx 4.0 final release was announced on 16 June 2019.

In this version, OpenMandriva Association announced that OpenMandriva Lx 4.0 have switched to RPMv4 and dnf has replaced urpmi. Due to that, rpmdrake was replaced by Dnfdragora.

Screenshots

More screenshots 

 OpenMandriva Gallery
 OpenMandriva Lx 4.0 screenshots

See also
 ROSA Linux
 Mageia
 PCLinuxOS

References

External links 
 
 OpenMandriva Lx Forum
 OpenMandriva Lx Wiki
 OpenMandriva Lx Bugzilla
 OpenMandriva Matrix Room
 
OpenMandriva on OpenSourceFeed Gallery

KDE
Mandriva Linux
RPM-based Linux distributions
X86-64 Linux distributions
Linux distributions